Zhou, known in historiography as the Northern Zhou, was a Xianbei-led dynasty of China that lasted from 557 to 581. One of the Northern dynasties of China's Northern and Southern dynasties period, it succeeded the Western Wei dynasty and was eventually overthrown by the Sui dynasty.

History
The Northern Zhou's basis of power was established by Yuwen Tai, who was paramount general of Western Wei, following the split of Northern Wei into Western Wei and Eastern Wei in 535.  After Yuwen Tai's death in 556, Yuwen Tai's nephew Yuwen Hu forced Emperor Gong of Western Wei to yield the throne to Yuwen Tai's son Yuwen Jue (Emperor Xiaomin), establishing Northern Zhou. The reigns of the first three emperors (Yuwen Tai's sons) Emperor Xiaomin, Emperor Ming, and Emperor Wu were dominated by Yuwen Hu, until Emperor Wu ambushed and killed Yuwen Hu in 572 and assumed power personally. With Emperor Wu as a capable ruler, Northern Zhou destroyed rival Northern Qi in 577, taking over Northern Qi's territory. However, Emperor Wu's death in 578 doomed the state, as his son Emperor Xuan was an arbitrary and violent ruler whose unorthodox behavior greatly weakened the state. After his death in 580, when he was already nominally retired (Taishang Huang), Xuan's father-in-law Yang Jian took power, and in 581 seized the throne from Emperor Xuan's son Emperor Jing, establishing Sui. The young Emperor Jing and the imperial Yuwen clan, were subsequently slaughtered by Yang Jian.

The area was known as Guannei 關內. The Northern Zhou drew upon the Zhou dynasty for inspiration. The Northern Zhou military included Han Chinese.

Trade contacts with Sogdians and Turks
The Tomb of An Jia, a Sogdian merchant (518-579 CE) based in China during the Northern Zhou dynasty, shows the omnipresence of the Turks (at the time of the First Turkic Khaganate), who were probably the main trading partners of the Sogdians in China. The Hephthalites are essentially absent, or possibly showed once as a vassal ruler outside of the yurt of the Turk Qaghan, as they probably had been replaced by Turk hegemony by that time (they were destroyed by the alliance of the Sasanians and the Turks between 556 and 560 CE). In contrast, the Hephthalites are omnipresent in the Tomb of Wirkak, who, although he died at the same time of An Jia was much older at 85: Wirkak may therefore have primarily dealt with the Hephthalites during his younger years.

Cultural artifacts

Numerous artifacts are known from the period, many of them showing contacts with Sogdians merchants who resided in China and often had official administrative positions (seen in the Tomb of An Jia or the Tomb of Wirkak), or even with northern India (Tomb of Li Dan). Central Asian precious artifacts were often included in the funeral material of Chinese people of high rank, as seen in the tomb of the Xianbei-Tuoba Northern Zhou general Li Xian.

Buddhism
Buddhism and Buddhist art flourished under the Northern Zhou. The dynasty also contributed some of the paintings in the Dunhuang caves: specifically, narrative paintings of the biography of the Buddha in Cave 428, following the prototypes of Gandhara and Kizil.

Emperors

Emperors' family tree

See also 

 List of pre-modern great powers

Notes

References

Citations

Sources 

 Book of Zhou
 History of Northern Dynasties
 Zizhi Tongjian

External links 
 

 
Dynasties in Chinese history
Former countries in Chinese history
557 establishments
581 disestablishments
6th-century establishments in China
6th-century disestablishments in China